Mark is a common male given name and is related to the Latin word Mars. It means "consecrated to the god Mars", and also may mean "God of war" or "to be warlike". Marcus was one of the three most common Roman given names.

Meaning and history
Mark is a form of the name Marcus. Mark the Evangelist is the traditionally ascribed eponymous author of the second Gospel in the New Testament. He is the patron saint of Venice, where he is supposedly buried. Though in use during the Middle Ages, Mark was not common in the English-speaking world until the 19th century, when it began to be used alongside the classical form Marcus.

In the Celtic legend of Tristan and Isolde this was the name of a king of Cornwall. It was also borne by the American author Mark Twain ((1835–1910), real name Samuel Clemens), the author of Tom Sawyer and Huckleberry Finn. He took his pen name from a call used by riverboat workers on the Mississippi River to indicate a depth of two fathoms. This is also the usual English spelling of the name of the 1st-century BC Roman triumvir Marcus Antonius (Mark Antony).

In other languages

Academics
Mark Adler (born 1959), American software engineer
Mark Azadovsky (1888–1954), Russian scholar of folk-tales and Russian literature
Mark Benecke (born 1970), German forensic biologist
Mark Blaug (1927–2011), Dutch-born British economist 
Mark Buchanan (born 1961), American physicist
Mark Catesby (1682–1749), English naturalist
Mark Wayne Chase (born 1951), American-born British botanist
Mark R. Cohen (born 1943), American scholar of Jewish history
Mark Dean (computer scientist) (born 1957), American inventor and a computer engineer
Mark Fettes (born 1961), Canadian Esperantist
Mark Fisher (theorist) (1968–2017), British cultural theorist and philosopher
Mark Z. Jacobson (born 1965), American civil and environmental engineer
Mark Jerrum (born 1955), British computer scientist and computational theorist
Mark Lilla (born 1956), American political scientist and philosopher
Mark van Loosdrecht (born 1959), Dutch biotechnologist
Mark Mazower (born 1958), British historian
Mark P. McCahill (born 1956), American computer scientist and internet pioneer
Mark Borisovich Mitin (1901–1987), Soviet Marxist-Leninist philosopher
Mark Oliphant (1901–2000), Australian physicist and humanitarian
Mark Overmars (born 1958), Dutch computer scientist, creator of Game Maker
Mark Pattison (academic) (1813–1884), English educational reformer and Rector of Lincoln College, Oxford
Mark Ptashne (born 1940), American molecular biologist
Mark Ridley (zoologist) (born 1956), British zoologist and writer on evolution
Mark Satin (born 1946), American political theorist
Mark Sedgwick (born 1960), British historian
Mark R. Showalter (born 1957), American astronomer
Mark Solonin (born 1958), Russian WWII historian
Mark Steedman (born 1946), British computational linguist and cognitive scientist
Mark van Vugt (born 1967), Dutch evolutionary psychologist
Mark Waer (born 1951), Belgian biomedical scientist and university president
Mark Wainberg (1945–2017), Canadian HIV/AIDS researcher and activist
Mark Walport (born 1953), British medical scientist
Mark Weiser (1952–1999), American chief scientist at Xerox PARC
Mark Zborowski (1908–1990), American anthropologist and Soviet spy

Acting
Mark Addy, English actor
Mark Benton, English actor 
Mark Burg, American film and television producer
Mark Dexter, English actor
Mark Eden, English actor
Mark Famiglietti, American actor and screenwriter 
Mark Fishbach, American YouTuber, Podcaster and Actor
Mark Hamill, American actor 
Mark Harmon, American actor, producer and director
Mark Herras, Filipino actor
Mark Gatiss, English actor, comedian, screenwriter, producer and director
Mark Indelicato, American actor
Mark Lamarr, English actor and screenwriter
Mark LaMura (1948–2017), American actor
Mark Lenard, American actor
Mark Linn-Baker, American actor
Mark McKinney (born 1959), Canadian actor and comedian
Mark McManus (1935–1994), Scottish actor
Mark Miller (1924–2022), American stage and television actor and writer
Mark Pellegrino, American actor, best known as Jacob in Lost
Mark Proksch, American actor and impersonator. Known for On Cinema and What We Do in the Shadows.
Mark Rendall, voice actor and actor
Mark Robson (film director), American film director
Mark Ruffalo, American actor
Mark Rylance, English actor
Mark Salling, American actor who was best known for playing Noah Puckerman on Glee
Mark Samaranayake (1914–2000), Sri Lankan Sinhala cinema and stage actor
Mark Seibert, German musical theatre actor.
Mark A. Sheppard, actor best known as Crowley on Supernatural.
Mark Allen Shepherd, actor
Marc Singer, American actor known for his role as Beastmaster and starring in the mini-series V
Mark Strickson, English actor
 Mark Sinclair (better known as Vin Diesel), American actor, writer, director and producer
Mark Wahlberg, actor, previously known as musician Marky Mark
Mark Williams (actor), British actor, comedian and scriptwriter
Mark Womack (British actor) (born 1960)
Mark Zakharov, Russian director and screenwriter

Arts
Mark Heyes, British fashion presenter
Mark Kermode, film critic
Mark Kostabi, Estonian-American artist
Mark Rothko, abstract-expressionist painter
Mark Ryden, pop-surrealist painter
Mark Steel, British satirical comedian
Mark Tobey, American abstract expressionist painter
Mark Tompkins (dancer), artist, dancer and choreographer of contemporary dance
 Mark Tremonti (American musician and singer, in rock bands Alter Bridge, Tremonti and founding member of Creed)

Business
Mark Cuban, American entrepreneur
Mark Leiter (businessman), Executive Vice President at Nielsen
Mark Loughridge, Vice-President of IBM
Mark Morton (businessman), co-founder of Morton Salt
Mark Shepherd (businessman), chairman and chief executive officer of Texas Instruments
Mark Shuttleworth, South African entrepreneur
Mark Zuckerberg, founder and CEO of Facebook

Christianity
Mark the Evangelist, one of the gospel writers of the life of Jesus
Marcus I of Byzantium, bishop of Byzantium from 198 to 211 AD
Pope Mark, pope of the Catholic Church
Mark Ibn Kunbar, twelfth-century Coptic priest and preacher
Mark of Ephesus, 15th century Archbishop of Ephesus, Opponent of the Union of Florence
Patriarch Mark II of Constantinople, reigned from 1465 to 1466

Literature
Mark Z. Danielewski (born 1966), American novelist
Mark Lynas, British author, journalist and environmental activist 
Mark Shepherd (novelist), author of several novels in the fantasy genre
Mark Shulman (author), American children's author
Mark Andrew Smith, American graphic novelist
Mark Twain, pen name of American author Samuel Langhorne Clemens
Mark Van Doren, American poet and literary critic
Mark Waid, American comic book writer

Music
Mark Balderas, keyboardist for the alternative rock band Human Drama
Mark Bautista, Filipino singer
Mark "Moke" Bistany, former drummer for Otep, Puddle of Mudd and Against All Will
Mark Farner, American musician
Mark Feehily, Irish singer in pop group Westlife
Mark Gasser, British concert pianist
Mark "Barney" Greenway singer in British band Napalm Death
Mark Hoppus, singer/bassist for the rock bands blink-182 and +44
Mark Jansen, Dutch guitarist, singer, songwriter for Epica
Mark Knopfler, British musician, member of Dire Straits,
Mark Lanegan, lead singer of American grunge band Screaming Trees
Mark Lee, Canadian-Korean rapper of South Korean band NCT
Mark Linkous, singer from American band Sparklehorse
Mark McClelland, bass guitarist for Little Doses, previously for Snow Patrol
Mark McGrath, singer of American rock band Sugar Ray
Mark Mendoza,  American bass guitarist
Mark Morrison (born 1972), German-born British R&B singer
Mark Morton (guitarist), guitarist from American band Lamb of God
Mark Mothersbaugh, American composer, co-founder of Devo
Mark Owen, British singer-songwriter, member of pop band Take That
Mark Peddle, Canadian musician
Mark Refoy, guitarist for Spiritualized, Slipstream, Pet Shop Boys
Mark Ronson, British-American music performer, producer and DJ
Mark Sandman, American musician, ex-member of bands Morphine and Treat Her Right
Mark Schultz, American contemporary Christian singer
Mark Slaughter, American musician, singer and songwriter for hard rock band Slaughter
Mark Speer, American guitarist and founder of Khruangbin
Mark Stoermer, American musician and member of The Killers
Mark Stuart (musician), vocals for Christian band Audio Adrenaline
Mark Swed, American music critic, chief classical music critic of the Los Angeles Times since 1996
Mark Tuan, American-Taiwanese member of South Korean band GOT7
Mark Vincent, Australian opera singer
Marky Mark, American rapper, now goes by Mark Wahlberg
Mark Wells (musician), Australian guitarist and musician, ex-member of The Ronnie Wood Band and Twenty Two Hundred
Mark Richardson (musician), UK Singer songwriter based in Japan with the electro outfit Age of Jets

Politics
Mark Diamond Addy, Ghanaian politician
Mark Antony, Roman politician and general
Mark Collett, British political activist 
Mark Dayton, former governor and U.S. senator from Minnesota
Mark Demesmaeker, Belgian politician and MEP
Mark Eyskens, Belgian economist, Prime Minister of Belgium in 1981
Mark Herring, American politician and current Attorney General of Virginia
Mark Kelly, American politician and astronaut; current U.S. senator from Arizona
Mark Latham, Australian politician
Mark McGowan, Australian politician, Premier of Western Australia
Mark Pollard, Falkland Islands politician
Mark Pryor, American lawyer, politician
Mark Ricks, American politician
Mark Rutte, Minister-President of the Netherlands
Mark M. Shelton, American politician
Mark Shepard, Vermont state senator
Mark Snoeren, member of the Dutch House of Representatives
Mark Spencer, British Member of Parliament
Mark Squilla, Philadelphia city councilman
Mark Tisdel, Michigan state representative
Mark Villar, Filipino politician and businessman
Mark Warner, former governor of and current U.S. senator from Virginia

Sports
Mark Allen (snooker player), Northern Irish snooker player
Mark Andrews (American football) (born 1996), American football player
Mark Beck (born 1994), footballer
Mark Belanger (1944–1998), American baseball player
Mark Bell (ice hockey), Canadian ice hockey player
Mark Bellhorn, American baseball player
Mark Berger (judoka), Canadian Olympic silver & bronze heavyweight judoka
Mark van Bommel, Dutch footballer
Mark Bott (born 1986), English cricketer
Mark Boucher, South African cricketer
Mark Bresciano, Australian soccer player
Mark Brunell, American football player
Mark Buehrle, American baseball player
Mark Calaway, American professional wrestler who uses the stage name "The Undertaker"
Mark Canha (born 1989), American baseball player
Mark Casale, American football player
Mark Cavendish, professional racing cyclist
Mark Chatfield, American breaststroke swimmer
Mark Clear (born 1956), American baseball player
Mark Cohon, Canadian Football League Commissioner
Mark Dale, English cricketer
Mark Dean (swimmer), American swimmer
Mark DeRosa, American baseball player
Mark de Vries (born 1975), Dutch footballer
Mark Didio, American football player
Mark Dismore, American indycar driver
Mark Dusbabek, American football player
Mark Donohue, American racing driver
Mark Ealham, English cricketer
Mark Ellis (baseball), American baseball player
Mark Evans (rower), Canadian rower
Mark Few (born 1962), American basketball coach
Mark Fidrych (1954–2009), American baseball player
Mark-Jan Fledderus (born 1982), Dutch footballer
Mark Forsythe, Northern Irish long jumper
Mark Friedman (born 1995), Canadian National Hockey League player
Mark Garner, Australian track and field sprinter
Mark Gilbert, American Major League Baseball player, and US Ambassador
Mark Gilbert (American football) (born 1997), American football player
Mark Giordano, Canadian ice hockey player
Mark Gorski, American track cyclist and cycling manager
Mark Guy, American football player
Mark Henry, American weightlifter and professional wrestler
Mark Hughes, Welsh football manager and former player
Mark Huizinga (born 1973), Dutch judoka
Mark Hunt, New Zealand mixed martial artist
Mark Inglis (born 1959), New Zealand mountaineer
Mark Ingram Sr. (born 1965), American football player
Mark Ingram II (born 1989), American football player
Mark Jindrak, American professional wrestler
Mark Kafentzis, American football player
Mark Kellar, American football player
Mark Kennedy (footballer, born 1976), Irish footballer
Mark Koenig (1904–1993), American baseball player
Mark Lapidus (born 1995), Estonian chess player
Mark Lazarus (born 1938), English soccer player 
Mark Lyons, American basketball player in Israeli Basketball Premier League
Mark Major, Canadian ice hockey player
Mark Mangino (born 1956), American football coach
Mark Martin (born 1959), NASCAR driver
Mark McGwire (born 1963), American baseball player
Mark Messier (born 1961), Canadian retired hockey player
Mark Midler (1931-2012), Soviet two-time Olympic champion foil fencer
Mark Mulder, American baseball player
Mark Nenow, American long-distance runner
Mark Noble, English footballer
Mark O'Meara (born 1957), American professional golfer
Mark Otten (born 1985), Dutch footballer
Mark Paré, Canadian NHL official
Mark Payton (born 1991), American professional baseball player
Mark Phillips, British Olympic gold-medal horseman
Mark Pinger, German swimmer
Mark Price, American basketball player
Mark Rakita (born 1938), Soviet two-time Olympic champion saber fencer
Mark Recchi, Canadian hockey player
Mark Reid (born 1961), Scottish footballer
Mark Richt (born 1960), American football coach
Mark Ricks (gridiron football), American football player
Mark Robinson (darts player), English darts player
Mark Roth (born 1951), American pro bowler
Mark Robins, English football manager and former player
Mark Roopenian, American football player
Mark Rypien, American football player
Mark Sanchez American football player
Mark Sanford (basketball) American basketball player
Mark Selby, English professional snooker and pool player
Mark Shapiro (sports executive), American baseball executive
Mark Siebeck, German volleyball player
Mark Simoneau, American football player
Mark Sloan (wrestler), British wrestler
Mark Spitz (born 1950), American nine-time Olympic champion swimmer
Mark Stanforth, American marathon runner and coach
Mark Stephney, Montserratian cricketer
Mark Stone (ice hockey), Canadian ice hockey player
Mark Streit, Swiss professional ice hockey defenceman
Mark Švets, Estonian footballer
Mark Taimanov, Soviet Russian chess player
Mark Teixeira, professional baseball player (MLB)
Mark Thorson, American football player
Mark Todd (equestrian), New Zealand equestrian
Mark Tollefsen (born 1992), American basketball player in Israeli Basketball Premier League
Mark Travers (born 1999), Irish footballer
Mark Traynowicz, American football player
Mark Trueman (born 1988), English football manager and former player
Mark Tuitert (born 1980), Dutch speed skater
Mark Turenshine (1944-2016), American-Israeli basketball player
Mark van der Zijden (born 1973), Dutch swimmer
Mark Veens (born 1978), Dutch swimmer
Mark Veldmate, Dutch footballer
Mark Viduka, Australian soccer player
Mark Vital (born 1996), American basketball and football player
Mark Walsh (darts player), professional darts player
Mark Walton (American football) (born 1997), American football player
Mark Ward (footballer born 1982), English footballer
Mark Warnecke, German swimmer
Mark Waugh (born 1965), Australian test cricketer (1991–2002) and twin brother of Steve Waugh
Mark Webber (born 1976), Australian Formula 1 driver
Mark Wiebe (born 1957), American professional golfer
Mark Williams (snooker player), Welsh professional snooker player
Mark Worthington, Australian basketball player
Mark Wotte (born 1960), Dutch football manager and former player

Crime
Mark Orrin Barton (1955–1999), perpetrator of the 1999 Atlanta day trading firm shootings
Mark David Chapman (born 1955), American assassin of John Lennon
Mark Goudeau (born 1964), American serial killer, rapist, and kidnapper
Mark Hofmann (born 1954), American counterfeiter, forger, bomber, and spree killer
Mark J. Newton, convicted child sexual abuser

Other professions
Mark Codman, American slave executed in 1755
Mark N. Brown (born 1951), American astronaut
Mark of Cornwall, king of Kernow in the early 6th century
W. Mark Felt (1913–2008), American FBI official known as Deep Throat
Mark Fischbach, (a.k.a. Markiplier) American YouTuber known as "Markiplier"
Mark Frerichs (born 1962), American civil engineer and former US Navy diver who disappeared in 2020
Mark Hulsbeck, American aquanaut
Mark Labbett, English TV personality
Mark Meechan, Scottish YouTuber
Mark Newhouse (born 1985), American professional poker player
Mark Salazar, Filipino journalist
Mark Uytterhoeven, Belgian television presenter

Fictional characters
Mark The Dj, a character from the 2010 dramatic/romantic musical film Burlesque
Mark the Minion, a character from the 2010 animated film Despicable Me
Mark Antony, a fictional representation of the person from the film Cleopatra
Mark Baker, a character from the 2003 film Cheaper by the Dozen
Mark Brendanawicz, a character from the NBC comedy television series Parks and Recreation
Mark Brennan and Mark Gottlieb, fictional characters from the Australian soap opera Neighbours
Mark David Chapman, a fictional representation of the person in fictional works
Mark Chang, a character from the television series The Fairly OddParents
Mark Clark, a character from the 1967 film Far from the Madding Crowd
Mark Corrigan, a character in the British sitcom Peep Show
Mark Dalton, character from the ABC Daytime soap opera, All My Children
Mark Donovan, a character from the television series The Inbetweeners
Mark Del Figgalo, a character from the 2008 short comedy film Zoey 101: Behind the Scenes
Mark Foster, a character in the American TV sitcom Step by Step
Mark Fowler, a character from the British BBC soap opera EastEnders
Mark Gordon, a character in the American fantasy drama television series Highway to Heaven
Mark Grayson, also known by his superhero alias Invincible, a character from the comic series of the same name
Mark Greene, a fictional character from the American medical drama series ER 
Mark Halliday, a character from the 1954 film Dial M for Murder
Mark Hanna, a character from the 2013 film The Wolf of Wall Street
Mark Haskins, a character from the 2006 American sports drama film Glory Road
Mark Healy, a character in the American sitcom television series Roseanne
Mark Hoffman, fictional character and the secondary antagonist of the Saw franchise
Mark Hogan, a character in the American sitcom television series The Hogan Family
Mark Taylor Jackson, a character from the 2009 American film Funny People
Mark Jennings, a character from the 1985 film That Was Then, This Is Now
Mark Loring, a character from the 2007 American comedy drama film Juno
Mark "Skid" McCormick, a character in the American action crime drama television series Hardcastle and McCormick
Mark Renton, a character from the 1996 British film Trainspotting
Mark Simon, a character in the 1998 American science-fiction disaster movie Deep Impact
Mark Everett Sloan, a character from the ABC medical drama television series Grey's Anatomy
Mark Thackeray, a character from the  1967 film To Sir, with Love
Mark "Toad Boy", a character in the 1985 American horror comedy movie Ghoulies
Mark Wells, a fictional representation of the hockey player
Mark Williams, a character from the BBC medical drama Holby City
Mark Wylde, a character from the British ITV soap opera, Emmerdale
Mark Zuckerburg, a fictional representation of the person from the 2010 film The Social Network

Disambiguation pages 

Mark Adams (disambiguation)
Mark Alexander (disambiguation)
Mark Allen (disambiguation)
Mark Anderson (disambiguation)
Mark Andrews (disambiguation)
Mark Anthony (disambiguation)
Mark Armstrong (disambiguation)
Mark Arnold (disambiguation)
Mark Atkins (disambiguation)
Mark Atkinson (disambiguation)
Mark Austin (disambiguation)
Mark Bailey (disambiguation)
Mark Baker (disambiguation)
Mark Baldwin (disambiguation)
Mark Bamford (disambiguation)
Mark Barnett (disambiguation)
Mark Barry (disambiguation)
Mark Beard (disambiguation)
Mark Beaumont (disambiguation)
Mark Beech (disambiguation)
Mark Beers (disambiguation)
Mark Bell (disambiguation)
Mark Bennett (disambiguation)
Mark Benson (disambiguation)
Mark Berger (disambiguation)
Mark Berry (disambiguation)
Mark Beyer (disambiguation)
Mark Birch (disambiguation)
Mark Blake (disambiguation)
Mark Bond (disambiguation)
Mark Bowden (disambiguation)
Mark Bowen (disambiguation)
Mark Boyle (disambiguation)
Mark Bradley (disambiguation)
Mark Bradshaw (disambiguation)
Mark Brandenburg (disambiguation)
Mark Brennan (disambiguation)
Mark Brewer (disambiguation)
Mark Bridges (disambiguation)
Mark Bright (disambiguation)
Mark Brooks (disambiguation)
Mark Brown (disambiguation)
Mark Browne (disambiguation)
Mark Bryant (disambiguation)
Mark Buckingham (disambiguation)
Mark Bunn (disambiguation)
Mark Burgess (disambiguation)
Mark Burnett (disambiguation)
Mark Burns (disambiguation)
Mark Burstein (disambiguation)
Mark Burton (disambiguation)
Mark Cairns (disambiguation)
Mark Cameron (disambiguation)
Mark Campbell (disambiguation)
Mark Canning (disambiguation)
Mark Carlson (disambiguation)
Mark Carrier (disambiguation)
Mark Carrington (disambiguation)
Mark Carroll (disambiguation)
Mark Carter (disambiguation)
Mark Casey (disambiguation)
Mark Chamberlain (disambiguation)
Mark Chapman (disambiguation)
Mark Christensen (disambiguation)
Mark Christopher (disambiguation)
Mark Chua (disambiguation)
Mark Clark (disambiguation)
Mark Clayton (disambiguation)
Mark Cleary (disambiguation)
Mark Cohen (disambiguation)
Mark Collet (disambiguation)
Mark Collins (disambiguation)
Mark Cooper (disambiguation)
Mark Corrigan (disambiguation)
Mark Costello (disambiguation)
Mark Cousins (disambiguation)
Mark Cox (disambiguation)
Mark Coyne (disambiguation)
Mark Cross (disambiguation)
Mark Cullen (disambiguation)
Mark Currie (disambiguation)
Mark Curry (disambiguation)
Mark Curtis (disambiguation)
Mark Dalton (disambiguation)
Mark Daly (disambiguation)
Mark Davies (disambiguation)
Mark Davis (disambiguation)
Mark Dawson (disambiguation)
Mark Day (disambiguation)
Mark DeSantis (disambiguation)
Mark Dean (disambiguation)
Mark Delaney (disambiguation)
Mark Dempsey (disambiguation)
Mark Devlin (disambiguation)
Mark Dickson (disambiguation)
Mark Donald (disambiguation)
Mark Donovan (disambiguation)
Mark Draper (disambiguation)
Mark Driscoll (disambiguation)
Mark Duffy (disambiguation)
Mark Duncan (disambiguation)
Mark Eaton (disambiguation)
Mark Edwards (disambiguation)
Mark Elliot (disambiguation)
Mark Elliott (disambiguation)
Mark Ellis (disambiguation)
Mark English (disambiguation)
Mark Epstein (disambiguation)
Mark Estrin (disambiguation)
Mark Evans (disambiguation)
Mark Everett (disambiguation)
Mark Farrell (disambiguation)
Mark Feldman (disambiguation)
Mark Fellows (disambiguation)
Mark Feltham (disambiguation)
Mark Ferguson (disambiguation)
Mark Fields (disambiguation)
Mark Fischer (disambiguation)
Mark Fisher (disambiguation)
Mark Fitzgerald (disambiguation)
Mark Flanagan (disambiguation)
Mark Fletcher (disambiguation)
Mark Flood (disambiguation)
Mark Ford (disambiguation)
Mark Forster (disambiguation)
Mark Foster (disambiguation)
Mark Fowler (disambiguation)
Mark Fox (disambiguation)
Mark Francis (disambiguation)
Mark Fraser (disambiguation)
Mark Frith (disambiguation)
Mark Frost (disambiguation)
Mark Fuller (disambiguation)
Mark Gardner (disambiguation)
Mark George (disambiguation)
Mark Gertler (disambiguation)
Mark Gillespie (disambiguation)
Mark Gold (disambiguation)
Mark Goodwin (disambiguation)
Mark Gordon (disambiguation)
Mark Gottlieb (disambiguation)
Mark Graham (disambiguation)
Mark Grant (disambiguation)
Mark Gray (disambiguation)
Mark Green (disambiguation)
Mark Greene (disambiguation)
Mark Griffin (disambiguation)
Mark Gross (disambiguation)
Mark Hall (disambiguation)
Mark Hallett (disambiguation)
Mark Hamilton (disambiguation)
Mark Hammond (disambiguation)
Mark Hanna (disambiguation)
Mark Hansen (disambiguation)
Mark Hanson (disambiguation)
Mark Hardy (disambiguation)
Mark Harman (disambiguation)
Mark Harper (disambiguation)
Mark Harrington (disambiguation)
Mark Harris (disambiguation)
Mark Harrison (disambiguation)
Mark Hatton (disambiguation)
Mark Hawthorne (disambiguation)
Mark Hayes (disambiguation)
Mark Healy (disambiguation)
Mark Helfrich (disambiguation)
Mark Henderson (disambiguation)
Mark Henry (disambiguation)
Mark Herring (disambiguation)
Mark Higgins (disambiguation)
Mark Hildreth (disambiguation)
Mark Hill (disambiguation)
Mark Hilton (disambiguation)
Mark Hoffman (disambiguation)
Mark Hogan (disambiguation)
Mark Holden (disambiguation)
Mark Hollis (disambiguation)
Mark Holmes (disambiguation)
Mark Hopkins (disambiguation)
Mark Horton (disambiguation)
Mark Howard (disambiguation)
Mark Howe (disambiguation)
Mark Hubbard (disambiguation)
Mark Hudson (disambiguation)
Mark Hughes (disambiguation)
Mark Humphrey (disambiguation)
Mark Hunt (disambiguation)
Mark Hunter (disambiguation)
Mark Hutchinson (disambiguation)
Mark Hylton (disambiguation)
Mark Hyman (disambiguation)
Mark Irwin (disambiguation)
Mark Isherwood (disambiguation)
Mark Jackson (disambiguation)
Mark Jacobs (disambiguation)
Mark Jacobson (disambiguation)
Mark James (disambiguation)
Mark Jenkins (disambiguation)
Mark Jennings (disambiguation)
Mark Johnson (disambiguation)
Mark Johnston (disambiguation)
Mark Jones (disambiguation)
Mark Jordan (disambiguation)
Mark Joseph (disambiguation)
Mark Judge (disambiguation)
Mark Kaplan (disambiguation)
Mark Katz (disambiguation)
Mark Keller (disambiguation)
Mark Kellogg (disambiguation)
Mark Kelly (disambiguation)
Mark Kendall (disambiguation)
Mark Kendrick (disambiguation)
Mark Kennedy (disambiguation)
Mark Kerr (disambiguation)
Mark Killilea (disambiguation)
Mark King (disambiguation)
Mark Kingdon (disambiguation)
Mark Kleinschmidt (disambiguation)
Mark Kwok (disambiguation)
Mark Lambert (disambiguation)
Mark Lancaster (disambiguation)
Mark Lane (disambiguation)
Mark Laurie (disambiguation)
Mark Lawrence (disambiguation)
Mark Lawson (disambiguation)
Mark Lee (disambiguation)
Mark Lemmon (disambiguation)
Mark Leonard (disambiguation)
Mark Leslie (disambiguation)
Mark Levine (disambiguation)
Mark Levinson (disambiguation)
Mark Lewis (disambiguation)
Mark Lindsay (disambiguation)
Mark Little (disambiguation)
Mark Lloyd (disambiguation)
Mark Logan (disambiguation)
Mark Lopez (disambiguation)
Mark Lutz (disambiguation)
Mark Lynch (disambiguation)
Mark MacDonald (disambiguation)
Mark Mallia (disambiguation)
Mark Martin (disambiguation)
Mark Mason (disambiguation)
Mark Matthews (disambiguation)
Mark Mayer (disambiguation)
Mark McCormack (disambiguation)
Mark McCormick (disambiguation)
Mark McDonald (disambiguation)
Mark McGowan (disambiguation)
Mark McGuire (disambiguation)
Mark McKenzie (disambiguation)
Mark McMahon (disambiguation)
Mark McNally (disambiguation)
Mark Meadows (disambiguation)
Mark Meyer (disambiguation)
Mark Miller (disambiguation)
Mark Mills (disambiguation)
Mark Mitchell (disambiguation)
Mark Montgomery (disambiguation)
Mark Moore (disambiguation)
Mark Moran (disambiguation)
Mark Morgan (disambiguation)
Mark Morris (disambiguation)
Mark Morrison (disambiguation)
Mark Morton (disambiguation)
Mark Mullins (disambiguation)
Mark Murphy (disambiguation)
Mark Murray (disambiguation)
Mark Napier (disambiguation)
Mark Nelson (disambiguation)
Mark Newman (disambiguation)
Mark Nicholls (disambiguation)
Mark Nichols (disambiguation)
Mark Nielsen (disambiguation)
Mark Noble (disambiguation)
Mark Norman (disambiguation)
Mark Norris (disambiguation)
Mark O'Brien (disambiguation)
Mark O'Connell (disambiguation)
Mark O'Connor (disambiguation)
Mark O'Keefe (disambiguation)
Mark O'Leary (disambiguation)
Mark O'Neill (disambiguation)
Mark O'Shea (disambiguation)
Mark O'Toole (disambiguation)
Mark Olsen (disambiguation)
Mark Olson (disambiguation)
Mark Ormerod (disambiguation)
Mark Ormrod (disambiguation)
Mark Osborne (disambiguation)
Mark Parkinson (disambiguation)
Mark Parry (disambiguation)
Mark Paterson (disambiguation)
Mark Patterson (disambiguation)
Mark Pattison (disambiguation)
Mark Payne (disambiguation)
Mark Pearson (disambiguation)
Mark Perry (disambiguation)
Mark Peters (disambiguation)
Mark Petersen (disambiguation)
Mark Peterson (disambiguation)
Mark Phillips (disambiguation)
Mark Pilkington (disambiguation)
Mark Platts (disambiguation)
Mark Porter (disambiguation)
Mark Potter (disambiguation)
Mark Powell (disambiguation)
Mark Preston (disambiguation)
Mark Price (disambiguation)
Mark Pritchard (disambiguation)
Mark Proctor (disambiguation)
Mark Pryor (disambiguation)
Mark Quayle (disambiguation)
Mark Radcliffe (disambiguation)
Mark Radford (disambiguation)
Mark Randall (disambiguation)
Mark Read (disambiguation)
Mark Reed (disambiguation)
Mark Reilly (disambiguation)
Mark Rein (disambiguation)
Mark Reynolds (disambiguation)
Mark Richards (disambiguation)
Mark Richardson (disambiguation)
Mark Ricketts (disambiguation)
Mark Ridley (disambiguation)
Mark Riley (disambiguation)
Mark Ritchie (disambiguation)
Mark Roberts (disambiguation)
Mark Robertson (disambiguation)
Mark Robinson (disambiguation)
Mark Robson (disambiguation)
Mark Rogers (disambiguation)
Mark Rose (disambiguation)
Mark Rosenthal (disambiguation)
Mark Rosenzweig (disambiguation)
Mark Russell (disambiguation)
Mark Rutherford (disambiguation)
Mark Ryan (disambiguation)
Mark Sainsbury (disambiguation)
Mark Sanchez (disambiguation)
Mark Sanders (disambiguation)
Mark Saunders (disambiguation)
Mark Savage (disambiguation)
Mark Scanlon (disambiguation)
Mark Schneider (disambiguation)
Mark Schroeder (disambiguation)
Mark Schultz (disambiguation)
Mark Scott (disambiguation)
Mark Shapiro (disambiguation)
Mark Shaw (disambiguation)
Mark Shepherd (disambiguation)
Mark Sherman (disambiguation)
Mark Shriver (disambiguation)
Mark Shulman (disambiguation)
Mark Simmons (disambiguation)
Mark Simpson (disambiguation)
Mark Sinclair (disambiguation)
Mark Singleton (disambiguation)
Mark Slade (disambiguation)
Mark Slater (disambiguation)
Mark Sloan (disambiguation)
Mark Smith (disambiguation)
Mark Solomon (disambiguation)
Mark Sorenson (disambiguation)
Mark Spalding (disambiguation)
Mark Spencer (disambiguation)
Mark Steadman (disambiguation)
Mark Steele (disambiguation)
Mark Stein (disambiguation)
Mark Stevens (disambiguation)
Mark Stewart (disambiguation)
Mark Stone (disambiguation)
Mark Strauss (disambiguation)
Mark Stuart (disambiguation)
Mark Sullivan (disambiguation)
Mark Sutcliffe (disambiguation)
Mark Tandy (disambiguation)
Mark Taylor (disambiguation)
Mark Templeton (disambiguation)
Mark Thomas (disambiguation)
Mark Thompson (disambiguation)
Mark Thomson (disambiguation)
Mark Todd (disambiguation)
Mark Tucker (disambiguation)
Mark Turner (disambiguation)
Mark Twain (disambiguation)
Mark Tyler (disambiguation)
Mark Waddington (disambiguation)
Mark Wade (disambiguation)
Mark Wagner (disambiguation)
Mark Wakefield (disambiguation)
Mark Walker (disambiguation)
Mark Wallace (disambiguation)
Mark Wallberg (disambiguation)
Mark Waller (disambiguation)
Mark Wallington (disambiguation)
Mark Walsh (disambiguation)
Mark Walton (disambiguation)
Mark Ward (disambiguation)
Mark Warner (disambiguation)
Mark Warren (disambiguation)
Mark Washington (disambiguation)
Mark Waters (disambiguation)
Mark Watson (disambiguation)
Mark Watts (disambiguation)
Mark Webb (disambiguation)
Mark Webber (disambiguation)
Mark Webster (disambiguation)
Mark West (disambiguation)
Mark Whitaker (disambiguation)
Mark White (disambiguation)
Mark Wilkins (disambiguation)
Mark Wilkinson (disambiguation)
Mark Williams (disambiguation)
Mark Williamson (disambiguation)
Mark Willis (disambiguation)
Mark Wilson (disambiguation)
Mark Withers (disambiguation)
Mark Wood (disambiguation)
Mark Woods (disambiguation)
Mark Wright (disambiguation)
Mark Yates (disambiguation)
Mark Yeates (disambiguation)
Mark Young (disambiguation)
Mark Zupan (disambiguation)

See also 
Martin (name)

References

English-language masculine given names
English masculine given names
Dutch masculine given names
Masculine given names
Theophoric names